Bailey v. Alabama, 219 U.S. 219 (1911), was a United States Supreme Court case that overturned the peonage laws of Alabama.

The Supreme Court considered the validity of the Alabama state court's ruling that Alabama statute (§ 4730 of the Code of Alabama of 1896, as amended in 1903 and 1907) was constitutional. The law read:

Alonzo Bailey was an African American from Alabama who agreed to work for The Riverside Company for one year at $12 per month. He received an advance of $15. After working for a little over a month he stopped work but did not refund any money. According to Alabama law such refusal to work and refund the money was prima facie evidence of intent to defraud. The evidence presented against Bailey at trial was testimony that he stopped working, without cause, failed to repay the $15 advanced to him and that he was a Negro.

The United States Supreme Court found that holding a person criminally liable for taking money for work not performed was akin to indentured servitude, outlawed by the Thirteenth Amendment, as it required that person to work rather than be found guilty of a crime.

Opinion 
The Supreme Court began its majority analysis, written by Associate Justice Charles Evans Hughes, by dismissing any importance of fact that the plaintiff was a black man. The Court then analyzed the statute at issue using the Alabama Supreme Court's decision in Ex Parte Riley, 94 Ala. 82 (1892) and stated, "To justify conviction, it was necessary that this intent should be established by competent evidence, aided only by such inferences as might logically be derived from the facts proved, and should not be the subject of mere surmise or arbitrary assumption." However, after the 1903 amendment to the Alabama law at issue here, the prosecution no longer had to prove intent to injure or defraud. The Court took issue with that change stating:

The Court continued by stating that without the inference created by statute in this case, Bailey would not have been convicted. The Court then turned to the constitutionality of compulsory service as required by the law.

The Court continued by discussing the meaning of the Thirteenth Amendment and the broad reading of involuntary servitude.  Further, in discussing peonage, stated, "The essence of the thing is compulsory service in payment of a debt. A peon is one who is compelled to work for his creditor until his debt is paid."  The Court again discussed the broad interpretation of the Thirteenth Amendment, "in this explicit and comprehensive enactment, Congress was not concerned with mere names or manner of description.... It was concerned with a fact, wherever it might exist; with a condition, however named and wherever it might be established, maintained, or enforced."

Analyzing the law by its effects rather than its pretense, the Court held that a contract may expose a debtor to the responsibility for his debt but not enforced labor.

Finally, the Court states, "what the state may not do directly, it may not do indirectly." Thus, the creation of a statutory presumption to facilitate convictions for failure to pay a debt that could not be otherwise prosecuted was found to be invalid.  Further, the peonage laws of Alabama were found to be contrary to the Thirteenth Amendment to the United States Constitution and therefore unconstitutional.

Justice Oliver Holmes dissented in this case. His analysis stated that adding a criminal sanction to a law with civil liability already in place goes to strengthen the law itself. Also, if a fine may be imposed, there must be punishment for nonpayment, which, in this case, is prison.  His logic continued by stating that indentured servitude, as a punishment for a crime, is expressly outside the reach of the Thirteenth Amendment:

See also 
 Black Codes (United States)
 Indentured servitude

References

Further reading
New International Encyclopedia

External links

1911 in United States case law
Bailey, Alonzo case
United States Supreme Court cases
United States Supreme Court cases of the White Court
United States Thirteenth Amendment case law
Debt bondage
1911 in Alabama